Richmondville United Methodist Church is a historic United Methodist church at 266 Main Street in Richmondville, Schoharie County, New York.  It is a nearly square building with an engaged entrance / bell tower built about 1900.  The two story, gable and hipped roof, wood frame parsonage was built in 1893.

It was listed on the National Register of Historic Places in 2006.

References

United Methodist churches in New York (state)
Churches on the National Register of Historic Places in New York (state)
Churches completed in 1893
19th-century Methodist church buildings in the United States
Churches in Schoharie County, New York
National Register of Historic Places in Schoharie County, New York